The 9th Precinct of the New York City Police Department is a police precinct in New York City. It is one of 77 NYPD patrol areas. Its boundaries are East 14th Street to the north, Broadway to the west, East Houston Street to the south and the East River to the east. It is three-quarters of a square mile in area, and it covers the neighborhoods commonly referred to as the East Village, Alphabet City, Loisaida and NoHo.

The 9th Precinct's nickname is "The Fighting Ninth".

History
The precinct was originally designated as the 15th Precinct. When a new police station, designed by the firm of Hoppin & Koen in 1912, was built at 321 East 5th Street, the 15th Precinct's numbers were carved into the sidewalk pediment. The 15th Precinct became the 9th in 1929 during a citywide renumbering of precincts.

The station-house was closed in May 2002 and demolished. A new, taller building was erected and the original stone facade was re-installed. While the station-house was being rebuilt, the 9th Precinct moved to 130 Avenue C and shared the building with PSA 4, a Housing Police unit that serves the area of Manhattan south of 59th Street. The "Fighting Ninth" moved into its new station-house at 321 East 5th Street on May 18, 2007.

Crime
The 9th Precinct ranked 58th safest out of 69 city precincts for per-capita crime in 2010. The 9th Precinct has a lower crime rate than in the 1990s, with crimes across all categories having decreased by 78.3% between 1990 and 2018. The precinct saw 0 murders, 40 rapes, 85 robberies, 149 felony assaults, 161 burglaries, 835 grand larcenies, and 32 grand larcenies auto in 2018.

Notable involvements
Astor Place Riot
New York Draft Riots
Tompkins Square Park Riot
Wigstock
The theft of A T Stewart's body
The Daniel Rakowitz case
The Jack Abbott case

In popular culture
The facade of the precinct's stationhouse at 321 East 5th Street has been used as the setting for several police television series, including Kojak, Cagney and Lacey, NYPD Blue, Castle, and Person of Interest. The precinct is called the 15th in NYPD Blue because those numbers can still be seen carved into the restored sidewalk pediment. The stationhouse facade was also used in the film Glitter.

References

External links 
Official NYC Gov Homepage
Official Ninth Precinct Community Council Website
Weekly Crime Stats from the 9th Precinct
The Fighting Ninth from NYCOP.COM

New York City Police Department precincts
New York City Police Department buildings